The Central American and Caribbean Championships records in swimming are the fastest times ever swum in the Caribbean and Central American region Championships, which are recognised and ratified by the CCCAN. All times are swum in a long-course (50m) pool.

All records were set in finals unless noted otherwise. All times are swum in a long-course (50m) pool.

Boys (11-12)

Girls (11-12)

Mixed relay (11-12)

Boys (13-14)

Girls (13-14)

Mixed relay (13-14)

Boys (15-17)

Girls (15-17)

Mixed relay (15-17)

Boys (18 & Over)

Girls (18 & Over)

Mixed relay (18 & Over)

References

External links
CCCAN Records

Central American and Caribbean Championships
Records
Records
Central America and the Caribbean